The Sunday Telegraph is a British broadsheet newspaper, founded in February 1961 and published by the Telegraph Media Group, a division of Press Holdings.

It is the sister paper of The Daily Telegraph, also published by the Telegraph Media Group. The Sunday Telegraph was originally a separate operation with a different editorial staff, but since 2013 the Telegraph has been a seven-day operation.

The Sunday Telegraph was first published on February 4, 1961, as the Sunday edition of The Daily Telegraph, which is a daily newspaper that was founded in 1855. The Sunday Telegraph has been published separately from The Daily Telegraph since 1977.

According to the Audit Bureau of Circulations, the Sunday Telegraph had an average circulation of 214,711 copies per week in the first half of 2021.

Digital edition
A digital only Christmas edition will be free on Christmas Day in 2022 like in 2005, 2011 and 2016.

See also

References

External links

1961 establishments in England
Publications established in 1961
Sunday newspapers published in the United Kingdom
Telegraph Media Group